Eucomis montana is a plant species in the family Asparagaceae, subfamily Scilloideae, found in South Africa (KwaZulu-Natal and the Northern Provinces) and Eswatini (Swaziland).

Description
Like other Eucomis species, it has a basal rosette of strap-shaped leaves. The inflorescence, produced in late summer, is a dense raceme.

The homoisoflavanone 5,6-dimethoxy-7-hydroxy-3-(4′-hydroxybenzyl)-4-chromanone can be found in the bulbs of E. montana.

Taxonomy
Eucomis montana was first described by Robert Harold Compton in 1967, after he retired to Eswatini (then Swaziland) where it was first found. The Latin specific epithet montana refers to mountains or coming from mountains. It is one of a group of larger, tetraploid species with 2n = 4x = 60 chromosomes.

Distribution and habitat
It has since also been found in South Africa, in KwaZulu-Natal and the Northern Provinces.

Cultivation
, it was said to be very rare in cultivation, but should prove to be "at least frost-hardy".

References

External links 
 

Scilloideae
Plants described in 1967
Flora of KwaZulu-Natal
Flora of Swaziland
Flora of the Northern Provinces
Taxa named by Robert Harold Compton